iHeartRadio (often shortened to just "iHeart") is an American freemium broadcast, podcast and radio streaming platform owned by iHeartMedia. It was founded in August 2008. , iHeartRadio was functioning as the national umbrella brand for iHeartMedia's radio network, the largest radio broadcaster in the United States with 128 million registered users as of 2019. Its main competitors are Audacy, TuneIn and Sirius XM.

iHeartMedia built its national event franchise around the iHeartRadio consumer brand including the iHeartRadio Music Festival, the iHeartRadio Music Awards, iHeartRadio Jingle Ball Tour, iHeartCountry Festival, iHeartRadio Fiesta Latina, iHeartRadio Wango Tango and iHeartRadio ALTerEgo.

History

iHeartRadio is owned by iHeartMedia, which was rebranded from Clear Channel in 2014. Prior to 2008, Clear Channel Communications' various audio products were decentralized. Individual stations streamed from their own sites (or, in many cases, did not owing to voluminous syndication and local advertising clearance issues), and the Format Lab website provided feeds of between 40 and 80 networks that were used primarily on Clear Channel's HD Radio subchannels, many of which transitioned to iHeartRadio unchanged. In August 2008, Clear Channel launched the iHeartMusic website, featuring entertainment news, national news, music content including albums, singles on demand, music videos, and access to over 750 Clear Channel radio stations online.

On October 7, 2008, Clear Channel Radio launched the first version of iHeartRadio to the Apple iPhone and iPod Touch through the App Store. Twelve radio stations in 8 markets were included in this first release. In 2009, iHeartRadio was made available to BlackBerry devices and the Android operating system and then Sonos in 2010. September 2011 marked the official launch of the free, all-in-one iHeartRadio service featuring thousands of live radio stations and custom artist stations. The launch coincided with the inaugural iHeartRadio Music Festival, the annual two-day event hosted by Ryan Seacrest at the MGM Grand in Las Vegas.

The app was expanded to the Xbox 360 and webOS. On April 20, 2012, iHeartRadio launched on the iPad. On June 8, 2012, iHeartRadio concluded a deal to power Yahoo! Music's Radio service, previously powered by CBS Radio.

In mid-October 2012, iHeartRadio launched online audio news, weather and traffic streams for Tampa, Chicago, Dallas/Fort Worth, Los Angeles, San Diego, New York City, and 15 other metropolitan cities, branded as "24/7 News". On March 1, 2013, iHeartRadio was added to the Roku digital media receiver. , the app was available on more than 250 devices and platforms.

In July 2013, iHeartRadio began adding stations from outside the United States like CHUM-FM and CFBT-FM in Canada and Virgin Radio Dubai in the United Arab Emirates. On July 14, 2013, iHeartRadio launched in New Zealand and Australia.

On July 24, 2013, iHeartRadio launched a new talk radio feature: iHeartRadio Talk. It featured original on demand programming from celebrities like Ryan Seacrest and allowed users to upload their own content through Spreaker. In 2014, the iHeartRadio Talk feature was rebranded to "Shows & Personalities" and in 2016 the feature became known simply as "Podcasts".

On November 10, 2015, iHeartRadio launched a spin-off app known as iHeartRadio Family—a curated experience targeting children. It features a simplified interface and a selection of age-appropriate stations (such as Radio Disney, and stations curated by artists and personalities popular among the demographic). Build-A-Bear Workshop served as a launch sponsor for the app, which included the addition of a "Build-a-Bear Workshop Radio" channel in the app.

During the 2016 iHeartRadio Music Festival, iHeartMedia announced subscription based on demand services "iHeartRadio Plus" and "iHeartRadio all Access powered by Napster". On December 1, 2016, iHeartMedia launched the services in beta on iOS and Android to the American users.

iHeartRadio launched in Canada on October 7, 2016, in association with Bell Media.

In 2017, iHeartRadio expanded Plus and All Access to other platforms including desktop in January 2017 at the Consumer Electronics Show (CES).

iHeartRadio launched in Mexico on October 29, 2018 in association with Grupo ACIR.

In 2018, iHeartMedia, aiming to cut its debt of around $20 billion in half, filed for what was described as the largest bankruptcy of that year and the 30th largest ever. The Los Angeles Times observed at the time that "About 265 million people in the U.S. still tune in to iHeart's stations at least once a month, but newer media such as Spotify's streaming service and SiriusXM's satellite broadcasts have cut into the audience and put a damper on sales."

From the start of service, many of its own radio stations that identified with a callsign and the metro area they serve have the end tag that identifies them as "An iHeartRadio Station", or for live national music stations such as Eclectic Rock or iHeart80s, their end tags identify them as "An iHeartRadio Original Station" (they also ID the HD2/HD3 stations that simulcast). Though starting in 2019, iHeartRadio introduces its own "Sonic Logo", a five-note sounder with two heartbeats at the end. It includes specific variations (including vocal versions) for different formats or productions.

In early 2020, iHeart fired "dozens" (estimated by one newspaper as "hundreds ... across its more than 850 radio stations") of its then 12,500 employees at a time when the company, bankrupt, was viewed as being considered for purchase by Liberty Media. iHeart described these layoffs as being technology-driven.

On April 23, 2020, the iHeartRadio app was launched in association with Uno Radio Group, which owns the NotiUno, Salsoul, Fidelity and Hot 102 brands in Puerto Rico.

On December 1, 2021, iHeartRadio signed a deal with Roku to bring a dozen of their live radio stations to The Roku Channel's live TV lineup. The ad-supported stations (which include iHeartCountry, Alt Radio, The Beat, Classic Rock, Hit Nation, Latino Hits, iHeart80s, and iHeart90s as well as select holiday-themed stations when available) was to feature imagery to complement and enhance the audio experience, similar in fashion to Music Choice on digital cable and satellite TV.

Acquisitions 
In September 2018, iHeartMedia announced it would acquire Stuff Media, LLC, a U.S. for-profit publisher of podcast content listeners, which included the HowStuffWorks podcasting business division as well as its slate of premium podcast content, for $55 million. With Stuff Media and iHeartMedia having had around 5.3 million and 5.6 million monthly listeners beforehand, respectively (according to Podtrac), the acquisition increased iHeart's lead as largest commercial podcast publisher, although it was still trailing behind NPR.

As of 2022, iHeartRadio is now the leading podcast publisher on Podtrac, with over 400 million downloads each month. In November 2018, iHeart also bought Jelli. In October 2020, it was announced that the company would acquire Voxnest, the parent company of Spreaker, a podcast hosting company. iHeart has since also bought Triton Digital from Scripps.

Investments 
In February 2022, iHeartMedia invested in Sounder.

Availability and supported devices
iHeartRadio is available in Australia, Canada, the United States, Puerto Rico, Mexico and New Zealand. It is available across 250 device platforms including online, and via automobiles, gaming consoles, home audio, mobile smartphones and tablets, TVs, and WatchOS.

Functionality and rating system
Listeners can hear live radio stations, personalized music stations, create playlists, listen to podcasts and more. The iHeartRadio player has a Like/Dislike (Thumbs Up/Thumbs Down) rating tool used on songs playing on live and customized radio stations. "Liking" or "disliking" songs for all live stations provides feedback to the station being played. "Liking" a song on customized stations will have it and songs like it played more often. "Disliking" a song on customized stations means that song will not be played again. This data is used to personalize users' "My Favorites Radio" station. As My Favorites Radio learns a user's music taste over time, it adds various bonus tracks into the mix. Songs can easily be removed from the station.

For a time since the service's beginnings until 2020, iHeartRadio had a "Discovery Tuner" to the custom stations where listeners could adjust the tuner to play familiar songs – or select "Less Familiar" to play a wider variety – or "Mixed".

United States

In 2019, The New York Times described iHeartRadio as the largest radio broadcaster in the United States, with 848 terrestrial stations. They aggregate over 850 local iHeartMedia radio stations across the United States, as well as hundreds of other stations from various other media. It includes more than 250,000 podcasts, offers a Music recommender system and on-demand functionality, and allows listeners to save and replay songs from live broadcasts in digital playlists. The on-demand features require a subscription fee (see Premium Tiers below). iHeartRadio is available across more than 250 platforms and 2,000 devices including smart speakers, digital auto dashes, tablets, wearables, smartphones, virtual assistants, TVs and gaming consoles.

International

Australia & New Zealand
Before 2014, iHeartRadio operated Australian Radio Network as a joint venture with APN News and Media but now operates as a licensed Australian version run solely by HT&E. New Zealand assets are now licensed by New Zealand Media and Entertainment.

Canada

On January 6, 2016, iHeartMedia announced that the iHeartRadio service would expand into Canada as part of a licensing deal with Bell Media. The company described the Canadian version of the service as being a "franchised" operation; Bell handles Canadian music licensing, marketing, and distribution of the service, and provides content from its properties. Bell also gained rights to organize Canadian versions of the company's branded events, such as the Jingle Ball, and co-branded the annual awards show organized through its cable channel Much as the iHeartRadio Much Music Video Awards.

The service went live in Canada on October 7, 2016, and on December 4, 2017, additional features were added to the service, including podcasts, additional stations, and a deal with Evanov Radio Group to add its stations to the service.

México 
iHeartMedia announced iHeartRadio’s expansion to Mexico on October 29, 2018 through an exclusive partnership with Grupo ACIR, a Mexican leader in broadcasting for more than 50 years. iHeartRadio México includes all 56 Grupo ACIR and 850 iHeartMedia live broadcast radio stations from across México and the U.S., including music, news/talk, comedy and sports content. Through the expansion, listeners also have access to all of iHeartMedia’s exclusive digital-only iHeartRadio Original stations spanning all genres of music, as well as Grupo ACIR’s own offer of digital-only stations featuring the most popular genres in México. Users can also access the top English and Spanish language podcasts and on-air personalities.

iHeartRadio Theater 
As of around 2017, iHeartRadio was regularly hosting performances at the iHeartRadio Theaters in Los Angeles and New York.

The iHeartRadio Theater located in New York at 32 Avenue of the Americas is a ground floor 250-seat theater which formerly was called the P. C. Richard & Son Theater; PC Richard sponsors them.

The iHeartRadio Theater in Los Angeles opened under that name in 2013.

See also
AccuRadio
Audacy
iHeartRadio Countdown
 IHeartRadio Country Festival
 iHeartRadio Fiesta Latina
 iHeartRadio Music Awards
 iHeartRadio Music Festival
TuneIn

References

External links

IHeartMedia
Internet radio in the United States
Internet radio in Canada
Internet radio in Australia
Internet radio in New Zealand
Music websites
Universal Windows Platform apps
Music streaming services
Podcasting companies